Kalahu or Kolahu or Kolahoo may refer to:
 Kalahu, Gafr and Parmon, Hormozgan Province
 Kalahu, Gowharan, Hormozgan Province